Kristoffer Vassbakk Ajer (born 17 April 1998) is a Norwegian professional footballer who plays for Premier League club Brentford and the Norway national team. Ajer has previously played for Start in the Tippeligaen and Celtic in the Scottish Premiership, where he also had a loan spell with Kilmarnock. Ajer played as a midfielder when he was at Start but when he was at Celtic he switched to a defender, presumably due to his height.

Early and personal life
Kristoffer Vassbakk Ajer was born in Rælingen, Viken County in Norway on 17 April 1998. In his younger years he was doing athletics, handball and ice hockey before ending up playing football.

As a youth player he originally started his footballing career at Rælingen FK before joining Lillestrøm SK when he was eleven years old. He was eventually picked up by IK Start in 2014, which marked the start of his professional footballing career as a result of his parents moving to the city of Kristiansand on the Southern coast of Norway. 

While playing professionally for IK Start, he attended Kristiansand Katedralskole Gimle (High School) where he was known as a very conscientious and diligent student receiving a total of 18 straight A's. He attributed this to his strong competitive instinct and self-discipline, as well as the support from his teachers and parents and the fact that he values having a good education outside of his footballing career. Ajer originally planned enrolling at the Faculty of Medicine at the University of Oslo while simultaneously playing football professionally, but he has since put those plans on hold. On the reasons why he excelled as a footballer, he attributed this to his early physical development, strength and maturity:

He is also a mentor/ambassador for the Equinor campaign for future athletes, entrepreneurs and talents in Norway called Morgendagens Helter ("Heroes of Tomorrow").

Club career

Start
He made his professional debut for Start on 19 July 2014 in a 2–1 win against Bodø/Glimt.

At 16 years of age, Ajer captained Start in a 1–1 draw against Lillestrøm on 7 April 2015, becoming the youngest ever footballer to captain a team in the Tippeligaen. While playing for IK Start he played both as a central midfielder, but was gradually placed as a central defender.

Celtic
In early January 2016, Ajer had a one-week trial with Scottish club Celtic. On 17 February 2016, he signed a four-year contract with Celtic and joined the club in June 2016 for a fee which could rise up to £650,000. He was loaned to Kilmarnock in January 2017 and returned to his parent club to become a mainstay in central defence. On 14 May 2018, Ajer penned a new four-year deal with Celtic. On 30 August, Ajer scored his first goal for Celtic in a 3–0 win against FK Sūduva.

On 24 October 2019, Ajer made his 100th appearance in all competitions for Celtic's first team in a Europa League match against Lazio.

Brentford
On 21 July 2021, Ajer completed a move to Premier League club Brentford on a five-year deal for an undisclosed fee.

International career
On 13 March 2018, he was called up for the first time in the senior national team, ahead of the friendly matches against Australia and Albania, scheduled for the following 23 and 26 March respectively. He made his debut on 23 March, in a 4–1 victory over the Australia national team.

Career statistics

International

Honours
Celtic
Scottish Premiership: 2017–18, 2018–19, 2019–20
Scottish Cup: 2017–18, 2018–19, 2019–20
Scottish League Cup: 2017–18, 2018–19, 2019–20

Individual
PFA Scotland Team of the Year: 2018–19 Scottish Premiership

References

External links

Living people
1998 births
Association football central defenders
Association football midfielders
Norwegian footballers
Norway youth international footballers
Norway under-21 international footballers
Norway international footballers
Lillestrøm SK players
IK Start players
Celtic F.C. players
Kilmarnock F.C. players
Brentford F.C. players
Eliteserien players
Scottish Professional Football League players
Premier League players
Norwegian expatriate footballers
Expatriate footballers in Scotland
Expatriate footballers in England
Norwegian expatriate sportspeople in Scotland

People from Rælingen